The Chief of the Armed Forces ( (CdA);) commands the Swiss Armed Forces in time of peace and reports directly to the head of the Federal Department of Defence, Civil Protection and Sports and to the Swiss Federal Council. The position was established in 2004.

History
Until the end of 2003, the highest level of command in the Swiss Armed forces was held by the General Staff, led by the Chief of the General Staff as primus inter pares. Together with other reforms of the Armed Forces, the position of Chief of the Armed Forces was introduced. Christophe Keckeis became the first Chief of the Armed Forces, having already served as Chief of the General Staff since January 2003.

General information
He leads the Swiss Armed Forces only in time of peace. Only in time of war, a commander-in-chief of the rank of General (four-star rank) is elected by the Federal Assembly.

List of Chiefs of the Armed Forces

References

External links
Chef der Armee at the official Swiss government website

Swiss military-related lists
Military of Switzerland
2004 establishments in Switzerland
Lists of Swiss military personnel
Switzerland